Clube União Idanhense is a Portuguese sports club from Idanha-a-Nova.

The men's football team plays in the Portuguese District Championships, the fifth tier of Portuguese football. The team was promoted to the fourth-tier Campeonato de Portugal league after winning the 2020–21 I Divisão AF Castelo Branco, but was relegated after just one season. The team enjoyed spells on the old fourth tier, the Terceira Divisão, in 1999–2000 and 2003 to 2007.

References

External link
Official site

Football clubs in Portugal
Association football clubs established in 1917
1917 establishments in Portugal